Giuseppe Mion (born 9 April 1959) is an Austrian ice hockey player. He competed in the men's tournament at the 1984 Winter Olympics.

References

External links
 

1959 births
Living people
Olympic ice hockey players of Austria
Ice hockey players at the 1984 Winter Olympics
Sportspeople from Villach